Bishop of Sydney may refer to:
Catholic Bishops and Archbishops of Sydney
List of Anglican bishops of Sydney